Angelo Tonini (November 26, 1888 – February 18, 1974) was an Italian long jumper.

Biography
He competed in the 1912 Summer Olympics. He was born in Arezzo and died in Milan. In 1912 he finished 19th in the long jump competition. He also competed in the high jump event but he was unable to clear a height.

Achievements

See also
 Men's high jump Italian record progression
 Italy at the 1912 Summer Olympics

References

External links
 
 List of Italian athletes

1888 births
1974 deaths
Sportspeople from Arezzo
Italian male long jumpers
Italian male high jumpers
Olympic athletes of Italy
Athletes (track and field) at the 1912 Summer Olympics